Bend Sinister is the ninth studio album by English post-punk band the Fall. It was released in September 1986 by record label Beggars Banquet.

Recording and production 

Bend Sinister was the third and last Fall album to be produced by John Leckie. When recording began, the band was without a drummer, as Karl Burns was fired shortly before sessions began. Ex-member Paul Hanley stepped in at first before permanent replacement Simon Wolstencroft was found. However, Leckie and Mark E. Smith argued during the recording, with Smith complaining that "he'd always swamp everything, y'know, put the psychedelic sounds over it". Leckie, for his part, drew the line at Smith's insistence that some tracks be mastered from a standard audio cassette that Smith had been carrying around and listening to on a Walkman.

Julia Adamson, who engineered some of the recording sessions, would eventually join the Fall in 1995 as a keyboard/guitar player.

Content 

The album's title, a heraldic term, is taken from Vladimir Nabokov's 1947 novel of the same name.

Release 

Bend Sinister was released in June 1986 by Beggars Banquet. It reached number 36 in the UK charts. It also became the first Fall album to be released on CD, with the addition of single "Living Too Late" and B-side "Auto-Tech Pilot".

The record was released in the USA and Australia in 1987 on Big Time Records re-titled as The Domesday Pay-Off Triad -Plus! with a different cover art, and replacing several tracks with songs from non-album singles "Hey! Luciani" (released on 8 December 1986) and "There's a Ghost in My House" (released on 27 April 1987).

The album was reissued by Beggars Arkive in March 2019. The new 2CD/2LP edition, titled Bend Sinister / The Domesday Pay-Off Triad-Plus!, was newly transferred and remastered from original analogue tapes, and features original album on disc 1 and non-album tracks from the contemporary singles on disc 2; in addition, the CD version contains the 1986 Peel session and several previously unreleased alternate mixes.

Critical reception 

Bend Sinister was ranked number 7 among the "Albums of the Year" for 1986 by NME. In his retrospective review, Ned Raggett of AllMusic described it as a "distinctly down affair", while Trouser Press called it "a rather gloomy, dark-sounding record". Al Spicer, in The Rough Guide to Rock, called the album "not a great album by Fall standards".

Neither Smith nor Leckie spoke highly of the album in later years. Nonetheless, the record contains the group's version of "Mr. Pharmacist", originally by US garage rock band The Other Half, which gave the Fall their first UK Top 75 entry and remained a regular feature of the group's live set.

Track listing

Vinyl LP

CD/cassette

The Domesday Pay-Off Triad-Plus!

2019 reissue

Disc 1 (Bend Sinister) 
 As per original 1986 LP

Disc 2 (The Domesday Pay-Off Triad-Plus!) 

Tracks 13-17 are previously unreleased. Tracks 9-18 only available on CD version.

Personnel 

 The Fall

 Mark E. Smith – vocals, tapes, keyboards, guitar
 Brix Smith – lead guitar, keyboards, vocals
 Steve Hanley – bass guitar, guitar
 Craig Scanlon – acoustic and electric guitar
 Simon Rogers – keyboards, guitar, programming
 Simon Wolstencroft (credited as 'John' S. Woolstencroft) – drums, percussion

 Additional personnel
 Paul Hanley – drums on "Dktr Faustus", "Living Too Late", "Hot Aftershave Bop", "Living Too Long", and "Luciani" (original version) 

 Technical

 John Leckie – production
 Ian Broudie – production on "Hey! Luciani" 
 Dale Griffin – production on Peel sessions
 The Fall – production on "Town and Country Hobgoblins"
 Tony Harris – engineering
 Joe Gillingham – engineering (uncredited)
 Julia Adamson – engineering (uncredited)
 Mike Engles – engineering on Peel sessions
 Mark E. Smith – sleeve design
 Steve Webbon – artwork
 Jeff Veitch – sleeve photography
 Kint B. – sleeve photography
 Larry Rodriguez – sleeve photography
 Lars Schwander – sleeve photography
 Steve Saporito – sleeve photography

References 

1986 albums
The Fall (band) albums
Albums produced by John Leckie
Beggars Banquet Records albums